Ernest W. Hahn is a sculpture of the founder of shopping center developer Hahn Company,  installed outside San Diego's Horton Plaza, in the U.S. state of California.

References

Outdoor sculptures in San Diego
Sculptures of men in California
Statues in California